Acianthella sublesta is a member of the Acianthella ("elf orchids"), which is  a small genus of tropical ground orchids previously included in Acianthus but distinguished "by tiny green flowers on long thin ovaries, sepals of similar shape and size, lacking apical clubs, narrow petals and no basal glands on the labellum."

It is very localised, growing from the Atherton Tableland to Eungella in Queensland at altitudes from 700 to 1300 m. in loose soil and litter in rainforest or along embankments and edges of tracks. It flowers from March to May. The flowers are green, tiny (3 mm diameter), and short-lived on green stems 30–60 mm tall. The callus plate extends for the length of the labellum. The anther is green, pink or purplish.

Footnotes

References 
 Jones, David L. (2006). A Complete Guide to Native Orchids of Australia, Including the Island Territories. New Holland Publishers, Frenchs Forest, N.S.W. 2086 Australia. .
 IPNI, Plant Name Details for Acianthella. Retrieved 28 September 2009

Orchids of Queensland
Endemic orchids of Australia
Plants described in 2004
Acianthinae